Scaphyglottis boliviensis is a species of orchid found from Central America to tropical South America.

References

External links

boliviensis